In mathematics, a Golomb ruler is a set of marks at integer positions along a ruler such that no two pairs of marks are the same distance apart. The number of marks on the ruler is its order, and the largest distance between two of its marks is its length. Translation and reflection of a Golomb ruler are considered trivial, so the smallest mark is customarily put at 0 and the next mark at the smaller of its two possible values. Golomb rulers can be viewed as a one-dimensional special case of Costas arrays.

Sophie Piccard also published early research on these sets, in 1939, stating as a theorem the claim that two Golomb rulers with the same distance set must be congruent. This turned out to be false for six-point rulers, but true otherwise.

There is no requirement that a Golomb ruler be able to measure all distances up to its length, but if it does, it is called a perfect Golomb ruler. It has been proved that no perfect Golomb ruler exists for five or more marks. A Golomb ruler is optimal if no shorter Golomb ruler of the same order exists. Creating Golomb rulers is easy, but proving the optimal Golomb ruler (or rulers) for a specified order is computationally very challenging.

Distributed.net has completed distributed massively parallel searches for optimal order-24 through order-28 Golomb rulers, each time confirming the suspected candidate ruler.

Currently, the complexity of finding optimal Golomb rulers (OGRs) of arbitrary order n (where n is given in unary) is unknown. In the past there was some speculation that it is an NP-hard problem. Problems related to the construction of Golomb rulers are provably shown to be NP-hard, where it is also noted that no known NP-complete problem has similar flavor to finding Golomb rulers.

Definitions

Golomb rulers as sets
A set of integers  where  is a Golomb ruler if and only if

The canonical form has  and, if , . Such a form can be achieved through translation and reflection.

Golomb rulers as functions

The canonical form has
 if .

Optimality

A Golomb ruler of order m with length n may be optimal in either of two respects:

 It may be optimally dense, exhibiting maximal m for the specific value of n,
 It may be optimally short, exhibiting minimal n for the specific value of m.

The general term optimal Golomb ruler is used to refer to the second type of optimality.

Practical applications

Information theory and error correction
Golomb rulers are used within information theory related to error correcting codes.

Radio frequency selection
Golomb rulers are used in the selection of radio frequencies to reduce the effects of intermodulation interference with both terrestrial and extraterrestrial applications.

Radio antenna placement
Golomb rulers are used in the design of phased arrays of radio antennas. In radio astronomy one-dimensional synthesis arrays can have the antennas in a Golomb ruler configuration in order to obtain minimum redundancy of the Fourier component sampling.

Current transformers
Multi-ratio current transformers use Golomb rulers to place transformer tap points.

Methods of construction
A number of construction methods produce asymptotically optimal Golomb rulers.

Erdős–Turán construction

The following construction, due to Paul Erdős and Pál Turán, produces a Golomb ruler for every odd prime p.

Known optimal Golomb rulers
The following table contains all known optimal Golomb rulers, excluding those with marks in the reverse order. The first four are perfect.

 The optimal ruler would have been known before this date; this date represents that date when it was discovered to be optimal (because all other rulers were proved to not be smaller).

See also
 Costas array
 Volunteer computing
 BOINC
 distributed.net
 Perfect ruler
 Sidon sequence
 Sparse ruler

References

External links
 James B. Shearer's Golomb ruler pages
 distributed.net: Project OGR
 In Search Of The Optimal 20, 21 & 22 Mark Golomb Rulers
 Golomb rulers up to length of over 200

Antennas (radio)
Distributed computing projects
Length, distance, or range measuring devices
Number theory